Patrick Baumann may refer to:
 Patrick Baumann (footballer)
 Patrick Baumann (basketball)

See also
 Patrik Baumann, Swiss footballer